The 2010 Hockenheimring GP3 Series round was a GP3 Series motor race held on July 24 and 25, 2010 at Hockenheimring in Hockenheim, Germany. It was the fifth round of the 2010 GP3 Season. The race was used to support the 2010 German Grand Prix.

Robert Wickens took his first GP3 victory in a chaotic Race 1, while dominant championship leader Esteban Gutiérrez took Race 2 honours.

Classification

Qualifying

Feature Race

Sprint Race

See also 
 2010 German Grand Prix
 2010 Hockenheimring GP2 Series round

References

Hockenheim
Hockenheim GP3 round